Kadijatu Kebbay (born 1986, in Freetown) is a Sierra Leonean model and beauty queen who won Miss University Sierra Leone 2006 beauty contest which took place on 29 July 2006. She won a Mazda saloon car and represented Sierra Leone in South Korea at the World Miss University contest.  

She is currently enrolled at the Institute of Public Administration & Management in Freetown. She was chosen by a panel of six judges at a jam packed event held at the Family Kingdom Resort at Lumley Beach in Freetown.

References

External links
https://web.archive.org/web/20071231123239/http://www.missuniversitysl.com/kadijatu.htm
http://news.sl/drwebsite/publish/article_20054130.shtml

Sierra Leonean female models
1986 births
Living people
People from Freetown